Alain Côté (born May 3, 1957) is a Canadian former professional ice hockey player who played for the Quebec Nordiques in the National Hockey League (NHL) and the World Hockey Association (WHA).

Playing career
Côté was drafted by the Montreal Canadiens in the third round (43rd overall) of the 1977 NHL amateur draft and by the Quebec Nordiques in the fifth round (47th overall) of the 1977 WHA Amateur Draft.

Côté played his entire career for the Quebec Nordiques from 1977–78 to 1988–89. In total, he played 106 games in the WHA and 696 games in the NHL.

Personal life
His son Jean-Philippe Côté also played in NHL.

Career statistics

Regular season and playoffs

See also
List of NHL players who spent their entire career with one franchise

References

External links

1957 births
Canadian ice hockey left wingers
Chicoutimi Saguenéens (QMJHL) players
Hampton Gulls (AHL) players
Ice hockey people from Quebec
Living people
Montreal Canadiens draft picks
People from Matane
Pittsburgh Penguins
Quebec Nordiques players
Quebec Nordiques (WHA) draft picks
Quebec Nordiques (WHA) players
Rochester Americans players
Syracuse Firebirds players